Andriy Valeriyovych Danayev (born 1 September 1979) is a former Tajik-born Ukrainian footballer who played as a midfielder and forward. During his career he became a journeyman, playing for 29 different clubs over 33 spells. He played in 7 different countries, playing in the top divisions of Poland, Armenia, Ukraine, and Azerbaijan.

Biography

Born in the Tajik SSR, Danayev's family moved to Ukraine at some point during his childhood. He began playing football with the youth sides of Zorya Luhansk, progressing to playing for senior teams from 1996 when he started playing for Metiz Luhansk. After making 7 appearances Metiz in his first season as a professional footballer he joined the Belarusian side Vedrich Rechitsa. He made 28 league appearances for Vedrich, scoring 3 goals in the process. In 1998 he returned to Ukraine, playing for Junior Luhansk, before joining Ukrainian top division side Mykolaiv. He failed to make an appearance for Mykolaiv in the six months he spent with the club, deciding to try playing his football in another country. 

In 1999 Danayev moved to Poland, first playing for I liga team GKS Bełchatów. Danayev made his debut for Bełchatów on 29 May 1999, the final game of the season, coming off the bench in a 1-1 draw with Odra Wodzisław. Danayev had not done enough to prove himself with Bełchatów, and ended up moving to play for Chemik Police. He played the start of the 1999–2000 season playing for Chemik, making 17 appearances and scoring one goal, in a season where Chemik would finish runners-up in the league. For the second half of the season Danayev played for II liga team Odra Szczecin, making 9 appearances for the club. He started his final season in Poland playing with Kaszubia Kościerzyna, joining Lechia-Polonia Gdańsk after the winter break. He made 5 appearances in total for Lechia-Polonia. During his two and a half seasons in Poland Danayev played for 5 different teams, not spending more than six months with each team. 

In 2001 he returned to Ukraine, and to Luhansk, this time to play for Agata Luhansk. He did not stay with Agata for long before moving to Russia to play with Dongazdobycha. His time with Dongazdobycha was successful, in which he scored 10 goals in 19 games. This successful spell in the lower leagues of Russia drew interest from the Kazakhstan team FC Caspiy, however Danayev went on to only make one appearance for the second division team. Once again Danayev found himself playing in the Luhansk region of Ukraine, starting with Inter Luhansk, where he played 11 games and scored 3 goals, before joining Donets Lysychansk, eventually returning to Agata Luhansk, where he enjoyed his most prolific time as a player, scoring 15 goals in 23 games. After this prolific spell with Agata it is known that he returned to Dongazdobycha, scoring 12 goals, but it is unknown how many games he played during this time. After playing in Russia for 6 months he again returned to play with Agata. Due to his prolific from over the previous 18 months Danayev eventually secured himself a move to second division club Stal Alchevsk.

Danayev played in the Ukrainian First League over the 2004–05 season, playing 30 games and scoring 10 goals. It was an impressive season for the club, as they went on to win the league and secured promotion to Ukraine's top division. Danayev started the following season on loan to Armenian top division club Urartu. After his loan deal ended he played the second half of the season for Stal playing his first games in Ukraine's top division. He made 7 appearances and scored 1 goal in what was his only season playing in the Ukrainian Premier League.

While without a club the following season, Danayev joined Agata, playing one game for the club, before securing a permanent move to Ukrainian First League team Zakarpattia Uzhhorod. Danayev spent the season with Zakarpattia before moving to Azerbaijan to play. He originally joined second division side MKT-Araz, but joined top division side Simurq PIK before even making a league appearance for MKT-Araz. In the Azerbaijani top division Danayev made 22 appearances scoring 3 goals.

Returning to Ukraine, Danayev had short spells with Metallurg NPVK and Kommunalnik Lugansk, eventually settling down for 18 months to play with Poltava. After his time with Poltava, Danayev played for Shakhtar Sverdlovsk, FC Popasnaya and GP Anthracite. After the Russian invasion into Ukraine in 2014 he began playing in the so called "LPR Football Championship" playing in newly created clubs that were not part of the Ukrainian leagues. He played for Zarya-Stal Luhansk, Spartak Lugansk, Dalevets Luhansk, and Zarya Academy Luhansk. During this time he also started his coaching career, coaching for Spartak and Dalevets.

Honours

Stal Alchevsk
Ukrainian First League: 2004–05

References

External links

1969 births
Living people
Ukrainian footballers
Association football midfielders
Association football forwards
Ukrainian expatriate footballers
Expatriate footballers in Belarus
Expatriate footballers in Poland
Expatriate footballers in Armenia
Expatriate footballers in Azerbaijan
FC Rechitsa-2014 players
MFC Mykolaiv players
GKS Bełchatów players
KP Chemik Police players
Stal Szczecin players
Kaszubia Kościerzyna players
FC Caspiy players
FC Stal Alchevsk players
FC Urartu players
FC Hoverla Uzhhorod players
FK MKT Araz players
Simurq PIK players
FC Komunalnyk Luhansk players
FC Poltava players
FC Shakhtar Sverdlovsk players